Bang Khu Rat is one of the eight subdistricts (tambon) of Bang Bua Thong District, in Nonthaburi Province, Thailand. The subdistrict is bounded by (clockwise from north) Phimon Rat, Bang Rak Phatthana, Bang Mae Nang, Ban Mai, Nong Phrao Ngai and Thawi Watthana subdistricts. In 2020 it had a total population of 40,360 people.

Administration

Central administration
The subdistrict is subdivided into 10 administrative villages (muban).

Local administration
The whole area of the subdistrict is covered by Bang Khu Rat Town Municipality.

References

External links
Website of Bang Khu Rat Town Municipality

Tambon of Nonthaburi province
Populated places in Nonthaburi province